Surendra Pal Singh (17 May 1917 – 10 December 2009) was an Indian politician and Union government minister. An agriculturalist, he was educated at Colonel Brown Cambridge School and Cambridge University, from which he took a bachelor's degree.

He was a member of the 3rd Lok Sabha from Bulandshahr (Lok Sabha constituency) in Uttar Pradesh State, India. He was elected to 4th, 5th and 8th Lok Sabha from Bulandshahr.

References

1917 births
2009 deaths
People from Bulandshahr district
India MPs 1962–1967
India MPs 1967–1970
India MPs 1971–1977
India MPs 1984–1989
Lok Sabha members from Uttar Pradesh
Indian National Congress politicians from Uttar Pradesh